A. G. Escandon served as a member of the 1869-71 California State Assembly, representing the 3rd District. He served again from 1873-1875.

References

Members of the California State Assembly